The following is a list of flags used in Sudan.

National Flag

Government Flag

Ethnic Group Flags

Military Flags

Political Party Flags

Sub-National flag

Historical Flags

Makuria

Alodia

Ottoman Empire (Turkish Sudan)

Mahdist State

Anglo-Egyptian Sudan

Independence

See also 

 Flag of Sudan
 Emblem of Sudan

References 

Lists and galleries of flags
Flags